Gabriel Michael Klobosits (born May 16, 1995) is an American professional baseball pitcher who is currently a free agent. He made his Major League Baseball (MLB) debut in 2021 with the Washington Nationals.

Amateur career
Klobosits, a native of Katy, Texas, pitched for Pope John XXIII High School and went on to play for the Galveston College Whitecaps. In 2016, he moved to Auburn University and pitched for the Auburn Tigers where he was reunited with his bestfriend, Andres Garcia. In 2017, Klobosits missed the cut for the Tigers' rotation and pitched mostly in long relief. He was drafted by the Nationals in the 36th round of the 2017 Major League Baseball draft and chose to sign with the organization.

Professional career

Washington Nationals
After signing, Klobosits began his professional career with the GCL Nationals. He was promoted to the Auburn Doubledays in July and then to the Hagerstown Suns in August. In 30.2 relief innings pitched between the three clubs, he was 1–0 with a 1.47 ERA and 1.01 WHIP.

He was one of several pitching prospects the Nationals brought up for a simulated game to prepare their major league hitters for the 2017 National League Division Series. Klobosits underwent Tommy John surgery in May 2018 after posting eleven appearances out of the bullpen for the Potomac Nationals. He split the 2019 season between the GCL, Potomac, Hagerstown, going a combined 0–0 with a 2.03 ERA over 26.2 innings. He did not play in 2020 due to the cancellation of the Minor League Baseball season due to the COVID-19 pandemic. Klobosits opened the 2021 season with the Harrisburg Senators and the Rochester Red Wings.

On July 30, 2021, Washington selected his contract and promoted him to the active roster. He made his MLB debut that night in relief. 

On April 6, 2022, Klobosits was designated for assignment by the Nationals.

Oakland Athletics
On April 11, 2022, the Oakland Athletics claimed Klobosits off of waivers. He appeared in 11 games for the Triple-A Las Vegas Aviators, struggling to a 7.59 ERA with 12 strikeouts in 10.2 innings pitched. The team designated him for assignment on June 8. He was released the same day.

References

External links

Auburn Tigers bio

1995 births
Living people
People from Katy, Texas
Baseball players from Texas
Major League Baseball pitchers
Washington Nationals players
Galveston Whitecaps baseball players
Auburn Tigers baseball players
Gulf Coast Nationals players
Auburn Doubledays players
Hagerstown Suns players
Potomac Nationals players
Harrisburg Senators players
Rochester Red Wings players